The 2005–06 Hong Kong First Division League season was the 94th since its establishment.

Teams

Buler Rangers 	流浪 
Citizen 	公民
Happy Valley 	愉園
Hong Kong 08                香港08 
Kitchee 	傑志 
Lanwa	東莞聯華
South China 南華 
Xiangxue Sun Hei 香雪晨曦

League table

Top scorers

All Competitions

Hong Kong players only

First Division League Goals only

No relegation
According to regulations, the bottom two teams, Hong Kong 08 and South China, were required to be relegated to the Second Division. However, both teams were retained in the top flight next season via HKFA exempted. Reason for retaining Hong Kong 08 is to give the team better preparation of 2008 Olympics Qualification games. South China was retained because the club promised to expand its next season's budget and sign new quality players. HKFA accepted this and hoped this would improve the competitiveness and attractiveness of the league.

See also
Hong Kong First Division League
List of football (soccer) competitions
Hong Kong Football Association

References
Rsssf.com. Retrieved on 8 July 2006.

External links
HKFA website

Hong Kong First Division League seasons
1
Hong Kong